Mahamane El Hadji Traoré (born 31 August 1988) is a Malian professional footballer who last played for FK Žalgiris as a midfielder in the A Lyga. Internationally, he represents Mali.

Career
Traoré previously played for Cercle Olympique de Bamako.

He earned his first cap with Mali in June 2005. At the youth level he played in the 2005 African U-17 Championship, scoring two goals.

On 17 February 2017, Traoré signed with Lithuanian club Žalgiris of the A Lyga.

International goals
Scores and results list Mali's goal tally first, score column indicates score after each Traoré goal.

Honours
Mali
Africa Cup of Nations bronze: 2013

References

External links
 
 Profile at Frenchleague.com
 

1988 births
Living people
Association football midfielders
Malian footballers
Malian expatriate footballers
Mali international footballers
Mali youth international footballers
2010 Africa Cup of Nations players
Expatriate footballers in France
Expatriate footballers in Lithuania
OGC Nice players
FC Metz players
FK Žalgiris players
Ligue 1 players
Ligue 2 players
A Lyga players
CO de Bamako players
Sportspeople from Bamako
Malian expatriate sportspeople in France
Malian expatriate sportspeople in Lithuania
2012 Africa Cup of Nations players
2013 Africa Cup of Nations players
21st-century Malian people